The Matthew Cartwright House is a historic house in Terrell, Texas. It was built in 1882-1883 for Matthew Cartwright, a rancher and banker. It has been listed on the National Register of Historic Places since April 4, 1979.

References

		
National Register of Historic Places in Kaufman County, Texas
Houses completed in 1883
1883 establishments in Texas